Ivan Perinčić (born 11 February 1977) is a Croatian professional basketball coach and former player.

Playing career 
Perinčić grew up with a youth system of his hometown team Zadar. A power forward, he spent his playing career in Croatia, Italy, Turkey, Bosnia and Herzegovina, the Czech Republic, and Hungary. During his playing days, he played for Zadar, Progresso Castelmaggiore, Zagreb, Türk Telekom, Dubrava, Cibona, Mlékárna Kunín, Široki, Falco Szombathely, and Zabok. He retired as a player with Zabok in 2012.

National team career 
In July 1994, Perinčić was a member of the Croatia under-18 team that won the silver medal at the FIBA Europe Under-18 Championship in Tel Aviv, Israel. Over four tournament games, he averaged 8.2 points per game. In July 1995, Perinčić was a member of the Croatia under-19 team that won fourth place at the FIBA Under-19 World Championship in Greece. Over eight tournament games, he averaged five points, 3.1 rebounds, and one assist per game.

Coaching career 
In July 2017, Zabok hired Perinčić as their new head coach. He left Zabok in July 2018 and became an assistant coach for Cedevita under Sito Alonso. In the 2019–20 season, he was an assistant coach for Gorica under Josip Sesar.

In July 2020, Perinčić became an assistant coach for Zadar under Veljko Mršić. On 15 July 2021, Zadar promoted Perinčić as the new head coach following departure of Veljko Mršić. On 18 October, Zadar fired Perinčić after a disappointing (0–4) ABA League season opening.

Personal life  
Perinčić comes from a basketball-playing family; his father is Čedomir Ćiro Perinčić, a retired basketball player, a semifinalist of the 1974–75 FIBA European Champions Cup with Zadar, and today a basketball coach; his aunt, Sonja, is also a retired basketball player for ŽKK Zadar, ŽKK Split, and for the junior's Yugoslavia national team; and his brother is Hrvoje Perinčić, also retired basketball player and now coach, working in the youth system of KK ABC Zadar.

Career achievements 
As player
 Croatian League champion: 1  (with Cibona: 2005–06)
 Croatian Cup winner: 1  (with Zadar: 1997–98)
 Bosnia and Herzegovina Cup winner: 1  (with Široki: 2007–08)

As assistant coach
 Croatian League champion: 1  (with Zadar: 2020–21)
 Croatian Cup winner: 2  (Cedevita: 2018–19; with Zadar: 2020–21)

References

External links 
 Perincic ABA League Profile
 Player Profile at eurobasket.com
 Player Profile at proballers.com
 Player Profile at fibaeurope.com
 Player Profile at aba-liga.com

1977 births
Living people
ABA League players
Basketball players from Zadar
BC Nový Jičín players
Croatian basketball coaches
Croatian expatriate basketball people in Bosnia and Herzegovina
Croatian expatriate basketball people in Italy
Croatian expatriate basketball people in Turkey
Croatian men's basketball players
Falco KC Szombathely players
HKK Široki players
KK Cibona players
KK Dubrava players
KK Zadar coaches
KK Zadar players
KK Zagreb players
Power forwards (basketball)
Türk Telekom B.K. players